The Plex is an indoor sports and entertainment facility in San Jose, California. The Plex is a 100,000+ sqft complex located in San Jose, CA and is the premiere eatertainment venue in the bayarea. Serving food from restaurants like Flights by Alex Hult, Sushi Confidential and Pizza @thePlex. Offering a huge selection of fun for all ages including sports leagues, bocce courts, pool tables, arcade, corn hole outdoor beer garden and much much more

History 
Sriker's Den was founded by David Silva in March 2007.  Silva first started working on the project with David Maley, founder of Rollin' Ice, a roller hockey venue Maley founded after retiring from the NHL, during the development stage of Silver Creek Sportsplex in 2004. In early 2006 Maley decided to go with a different candidate, Andrew Rolli, to lead the soccer portion of the business. After years of planning and working with the city to get the land rezoned and approved for construction the Silver Creek Sportsplex was built with Rollin' Ice on the north end of the business covering 80,000 sq. ft., and Club One Fitness on the south end of the building covering another 150,000 sq. ft. In the middle part of the property the area meant for 1 large and 2 small soccer fields was left empty as negotiations between Rolli, Rolli's partner Off The Wall Soccer, and Maley stalled.

In March 2007 Maley asked Silva if he was interested in returning to the project. Silva had spent the previous year setting up MVP Arena, a smaller facility in North San Jose, which had grown successfully, but was limited in its ability to serve the community. Silva talked tried to broker a deal between MVP Arena and Silver Creek Sportsplex to manage the business, but when his partners at MVP Arena did not express interest he left and joined Maley to create Striker's Den in March 2007.

By April 2007 the first leagues were started with men's, co-ed, and over-35 leagues. A Wednesday men's league was started in May, followed by a Sunday women's league in June. In June 2007 the two smaller fields were torn down to make way for a second large field, and by September the new large field was finished and all leagues were expanded. In late October the small fields were added back in a new area which was designated primarily for youth training and league play, and a new business unit, LOL Parties, which was created by Silva and his wife Monica, was started.

Activities 
The primary activity at Striker's Den is indoor soccer league play.  Most of the leagues are adult and play at night. In the winter youth leagues are formed primarily for competitive players, along with a recreational training program.

A lacrosse league was started in the summer of 2008 and continues to this day. An indoor flag football league lasted one season during the spring of 2008, but did not continue.

Regular Schedule 
Sunday evening - Women's league 
Monday evening - Co-ed league 
Tuesday evening - Men's 35+ league 
Wednesday evening - Men's league/Women's league 
Thursday evening - Men's league 
Friday evening - Co-ed recreational league

On Saturdays and Sundays during the winter there are youth leagues.  From spring to fall, the fields are also used for parties and special events run through LOL Parties.

References

https://sportsplex.popmenu.com/

Sports venues in San Jose, California
Soccer venues in California
2007 establishments in California
Sports venues completed in 2007
Indoor soccer venues in California